Danielle Moné Truitt (born March 2, 1981) is an American actress. She is known for her roles in BET's television series Rebel and Fox's television series Deputy. She currently stars as NYPD Sergeant Ayanna Bell on NBC's crime drama Law & Order: Organized Crime.

Biography
Truitt was born and raised in Sacramento, California. She was Miss Black Sacramento 2000 and studied theatre and dance at Sacramento State, from which she graduated in 2004. She briefly worked in banking after graduation, before joining a local theater company. In addition to starring in Rebel and Organized Crime, she is a two-time Ovation Awards nominee (The Mountaintop, Dreamgirls) and received an NAACP Theatre Award nomination for The Mountaintop.

Truitt was married to Kelvin Truitt as of 2007, but in 2021 revealed the marriage had ended. She has two children.

Filmography

Film

Television

Video Games

References

External links
 

Living people
1981 births
American film actresses
American television actresses
Actresses from Sacramento, California
African-American actresses
21st-century American actresses
20th-century African-American women
21st-century African-American women